Conrad Herbert Gesner (August 30, 1901 - September 1, 1993) was bishop of the Episcopal Diocese of South Dakota from 1953 until his retirement in 1970.

Early life and education
Gesner was born on August 30, 1901, in Detroit Lakes, Minnesota, to the Reverend Anthon Temple Gesner and Blanche Louise Pinniger. He was educated at Ridgefield School in Ridgefield, Connecticut. He then studied at Trinity College from where he graduated with a Bachelor of Arts in 1923, and was awarded a Doctor of Divinity in 1945. He also graduated with a Bachelor of Divinity from the General Theological Seminary in 1927, and earned a Doctor of Sacred Theology in 1946.

Ordained Ministry
Gesner was ordained deacon in April 1927 and priest in November 1927 by Bishop Hugh L. Burleson of South Dakota. He married Betty Merrell on June 23, 1927, and together had three children. Gesner served as Canon Missioner at Calvary Cathedral in Sioux Falls, South Dakota between 1927 and 1929, rector of Trinity Church in Pierre, South Dakota between 1929 and 1933, and then as rector of the Church of St John the Evangelist in Saint Paul, Minnesota between 1933 and 1945.

Bishop
Gesner was elected Coadjutor Bishop of South Dakota by the House of Bishops on May 2, 1945, and consecrated on May 2, 1945. He succeeded as Missionary Bishop of the District of South Dakota on January 1, 1954. He retired in 1970 and served as assistant bishop in Western Massachusetts and Connecticut. Gesner died on September 1, 1993, at McKennan Hospital in Sioux Falls.

References

1901 births
1993 deaths
20th-century American Episcopalians
People from Detroit Lakes, Minnesota
General Theological Seminary alumni
Episcopal bishops of South Dakota
20th-century American clergy